Me and My Shadows is the second studio album by singer Cliff Richard and third album overall. Recorded with The Shadows and produced by Norrie Paramor, it was released through Columbia Records in October 1960 and reached No. 2 in the UK album chart. The album was recorded at Abbey Road Studios.

No singles were to be officially released in the UK from the album. A pairing of album tracks "Gee Whizz It's You" and "I Cannot Find a True Love" was pressed as an export single intended for continental Europe but high demand in the UK meant it charted in March 1961 and eventually reached #4 in the UK singles chart. Although very popular for an import, this single broke what would have been a run of 15 consecutive top 3 singles in the UK, although it helped give Richard a record 16 back to back top 5 hits.

This album is the 2nd of only 5 albums [Cliff, Me & My Shadows, 21 Today, Finders Keepers, Established 1958] recorded by Richard with exclusive backing by the Shadows during the 1960s. All the others the backing duties are shared between The Shadows and the Norrie Paramor Orchestra.

This album was then re-marketed on the EP format into 3 EPs in mono only, Me and My Shadows no.1, Me and My Shadows no.2 and Me and My Shadows no.3.

Track listing

Release formats
Vinyl LP mono & stereo.
Reel to Reel Tape.(?) mono.
Cassette.(stereo)
CD mono
CD mono/stereo

Personnel
Cliff Richard and the Shadows
Cliff Richard – lead vocals
Hank Marvin – lead guitar
Bruce Welch – rhythm guitar
Jet Harris – bass guitar
Tony Meehan – drums

Production
Produced by Norrie Paramor
Engineered by Malcolm Addey

References

Cliff Richard albums
The Shadows albums
1960 albums
Albums produced by Norrie Paramor
EMI Columbia Records albums
British rock-and-roll albums